Taylor William Andrew Green (born November 2, 1986) is a Canadian former professional baseball infielder who played for the Milwaukee Brewers of Major League Baseball (MLB). After retiring, Green became a scout for the Brewers.

Amateur career

Green attended Mark R. Isfeld Senior Secondary School in Courtenay, British Columbia, and played high school baseball for the Parksville Royals of the British Columbia Premier Baseball League. He went on to play two years of collegiate baseball at Cypress College, where he was named a First Team Orange Empire Conference All-Star and Junior College 1st Team All-American.

Professional career
Green was drafted by the Milwaukee Brewers in the 25th round (745th pick) of the 2005 Major League Baseball draft. He made his professional debut playing for the Rookie League Helena Brewers in 2006. He was promoted to the Class A West Virginia Power in 2007. That season, in which he had a .327 batting average, 14 home runs, and 86 RBI, Green was named the Brewers Organizational Player of the Year. He also made the mid and post-season South Atlantic League All-Star teams. Baseball America selected him as a "Low Class A Third Base All-Star".

After the 2007 season, he was named to Team Canada's Baseball World Cup team which participated in the 2007 World Cup in Taipei, Taiwan, after which the team qualified for a spot in the 2008 Summer Olympics, although Green did not make the team.

In 2008, he played for the Class A-Advanced Brevard County Manatees. He was selected for the mid and post-season Florida State League (FSL) All-Star teams, and finished second in the FSL Home Run Derby. 

Green split the 2009 season between the Class A Wisconsin Timber Rattlers and the Double-A Huntsville Stars. His entire 2010 season was played with Huntsville.

Green began the 2011 season with Huntsville, but was promoted to the Triple-A Nashville Sounds after three games at Double-A. He was later called up to the major leagues for the first time late in the season. 

He made his MLB debut on August 31 as a pinch hitter, singling in his first at bat for his first MLB career hit. In 37 at bats, he batted .270.

He competed for a roster spot with Brooks Conrad and Zelous Wheeler in spring training in 2012. He earned a spot on the 40-man roster, however was optioned to Triple-A Nashville before being recalled in May and hitting his first major league home run off Carlos Mármol in a win against the Chicago Cubs on June 6, 2012, then was later optioned back to Nashville, but recalled in September.

In April 2013, Green underwent left hip surgery and missed all of the 2013 season. He was outrighted off the Brewers roster on October 4, 2013, but rejoined the organization and played in the minors in 2014 (Huntsville and Nashville) and 2015 (Double-A Biloxi Shuckers). He retired as a player and became a Milwaukee scout in February 2016.

References

External links

MiLB.com profile

1986 births
Living people
Biloxi Shuckers players
Brevard County Manatees players
Canadian expatriate baseball players in the United States
Cypress Chargers baseball players
Helena Brewers players
Huntsville Stars players
Leones del Escogido players
Canadian expatriate baseball players in the Dominican Republic
Major League Baseball infielders
Major League Baseball players from Canada
Milwaukee Brewers players
Milwaukee Brewers scouts
Nashville Sounds players
Peoria Javelinas players
Sportspeople from British Columbia
West Virginia Power players
Wisconsin Timber Rattlers players
World Baseball Classic players of Canada
2013 World Baseball Classic players
2015 WBSC Premier12 players
People from Comox, British Columbia